Andrzej Markowiak (born 27 March 1951) is a Polish politician and a member of Sejm 2001-2005.

See also
Members of Polish Sejm 2005-2007

External links
Andrzej Markowiak - parliamentary page

1951 births
Living people
People from Namysłów
Members of the Polish Sejm 2005–2007
Members of the Polish Sejm 2001–2005
Civic Platform politicians